Fragolino is an Italian red wine produced in Veneto with grape, or uva fragola (literally, "strawberry-grape"). This kind of grape does not belong to the Vitis vinifera species, but to the related Vitis labrusca and it was introduced to fight a plague of a parasite named phylloxera, which was destroying the European grapevine and wine production.

This American grapevine was more resistant to the parasites. Venetian winemakers had the idea to make wine directly with this new grape, and this wine was delicious. Sweet and refreshing, the fragolino is a summer wine, with a delicate aftertaste of strawberry. Fragolino, as fragola means strawberry. Moreover, it was inexpensive and became popular around the Venetian area, where it was produced. However, Fragolino is considered a very low quality wine among connoisseurs
Today, it is almost impossible to find the real fragolino because its commerce was banned by the EU and the Italian government. Many stories have been told about the fragolino ban. The more official one is that it was banned because it is difficult to control methanol levels during wine production and methanol can be poisonous. 

Some science revisionists argue that the Vitis labrusca was actually responsible, due to its resistance, to the spread of the phylloxera plague in Europe, and it was banned for this reason: but this confusing version of the story ignores the historical fact of its importation in Europe, France first, was made in the 19th century for the exact opposite reason, when the phylloxera was already destroying the Vitis vinifera cultivations.

References

Producers of wine 
Fragolino Novellina
Wines of Veneto